George Millar Sweet (1897–1969) was Scottish football manager who managed Scottish League club Cowdenbeath and junior club Solway Star. He also served Cowdenbeath as treasurer, secretary and was a member of the club's board.

Managerial career 
Sweet managed Scottish League Second Division club Cowdenbeath between 9 August 1948 and 21 April 1951. His highest placing was fifth in the 1949–50 season and he left the role with a record of 45 wins, 18 draws and 53 defeats in all competitions.

Personal life 
In September 1916, in the middle of the First World War, Sweet was working as a bank clerk and enlisted in the Machine Gun Corps. By the end of the war in November 1918, he was serving in the Tank Corps. Sweet returned to his banking job and became a manager with Royal Bank of Scotland.

References 

Cowdenbeath F.C. managers
Scottish Football League managers
Scottish football managers
1897 births
People from Cathcart
1969 deaths
NatWest Group people